Margarella bouvetia is a species of sea snail, a marine gastropod mollusk in the family Calliostomatidae, the top snails.

Description

Distribution
This species occurs in Antarctic waters.

References

 Zelaya D.G. (2004) The genus Margarella Thiele, 1893 (Gastropoda: Trochidae) in the southwestern Atlantic Ocean. The Nautilus 118(3): 112–120.
 Engl W. (2012) Shells of Antarctica. Hackenheim: Conchbooks. 402 pp.

External links

bouvetia
Gastropods described in 1951